KSTT-FM (104.5 FM, "Coast 104.5") is a commercial radio station that is licensed to Atascadero, California, United States and broadcasts to the San Luis Obispo and Santa Maria—Lompoc, California areas. The station is owned by American General Media and airs a hot adult contemporary format.

History
The station was first signed on in 1979 as KIQO by Midway Broadcasters Inc. In July 1984, Gareth F. Garlund and Anna Garlund sold their 80% stake in Midway Broadcasters to partners Gary F. Brill and Virginia Brill, who owned the other 20%, for $700,000.

In July 1998, Midway sold KIQO to Bakersfield, California-based American General Media for $1.5 million. At the time, the station carried an oldies music format.

On May 31, 2016, El Dorado Broadcasting sold the intellectual property of KSTT-FM (101.3 FM) in Los Osos-Baywood Park to American General Media as part of a series of divestitures of its Central Coast stations. The deal did not include the 101.3 FM frequency itself, which remained with El Dorado and changed its call sign to KJRW. The transaction was completed July 1, with KIQO dropping its classic hits format branded "Q104.5", picking up the KSTT-FM call letters and that station's adult contemporary format, and rebranding as "Coast 104.5".

References

External links

STT-FM
Hot adult contemporary radio stations in the United States
Atascadero, California
Mass media in San Luis Obispo County, California
Radio stations established in 1979
1979 establishments in California